Pawar Public School is operated by the Pawar Public Charitable Trust and it has four branches. Pawar Public School at Bhandup, Mumbai (ICSE) was the first school set up by the Trust which commenced in June 2006. The Bhandup branch in Mumbai was opened in 2006, followed by a branch as Hadapsar in Pune in 2008, in 2010 another branch was opened at Kandivali and a fourth one was opened at Chandivali in 2011. The Hinjewadi Branch was opened in 2013. It has a branch in Dombivali, established in 2014. The schools are affiliated to Indian Certificate of Secondary Education and Central Board Of Secondary Education. 

The school has a pre-primary, primary and secondary school, and a college.

See also 
 List of schools in Mumbai
 List of schools in Pune

References 

 http://www.afternoondc.in/sports/in-brief/article_17033

External links 

Schools in Mumbai
Schools in Pune